Sunam Udham Singh Wala is a town and a tehsil, near city of Sangrur in Sangrur district in the Indian state of Punjab. The city of Sunam Udham Singh Wala, which falls in Sunam Udham Singh Wala tehsil, was previously known only as Sunam. The Government of Punjab renamed it after the Indian freedom fighter and martyr Udham Singh in 2006.

History
Sunam is listed in the Ain-i-Akbari as a pargana under the sarkar of Sirhind, producing a revenue of 7,067,696 dams for the imperial treasury and supplying a force of 2000 infantry and 500 cavalry. It had a brick fort at the time.

Geography
It has an average elevation of 231 metres (757 feet). Sunam falls under the district of Sangrur. Located on the Ludhiana-Hisar railway line, it is connected, by road with Patiala (64 km), Sangrur (13 km), Bathinda(95 km), Ludhiana (90 km), and Chandigarh (129 km).

Demographics
 India census, Sunam had a population of 334,641. Males constitute 53.3% of the population and females 46.7%. Sunam has an average literacy rate of 75.6%, higher than the national average of 74.04%: male literacy is 79.6%, and female literacy is 71%. In Sunam, 11% of the population is under 6 years of age.

Politics
The city is part of the Sangrur Lok Sabha constituency.

Landmarks

Samadh Baba Bhai Mool Chand Sahib Ji
This is a place in Sunam where people from all religions/communities come to pay homage to a great saint of the 17th century. Descendants of his legacy are known as 'Bhaike' as they all are from a small village near Sunam named 'Bhai Ki Pishour'. Once every year they congregate in this ancestral village named ' Chhajjli' app. 10 km from Sunam, of theirs in a social gathering known as 'Babe Mitti'.

Peer Banna Banoi 

Before Partition of Punjab Sunam's population was predominantly Muslim, legend has it that if there would have been 1 more peer it would have been the first 'Peergah' (Makka) in the region with 100 peers but that did not happen as 1 peer lies just outside the boundary of the city and now Muslim Community constitutes about 15 families in Sunam. Peer Banna Banoi is an Islamic shrine in Sunam. People of all faiths pay homage as Peer Banna Banoi was a God fearing and a true Muslim who sacrificed his life on the day of his marriage to save the Hindu and Sikh girls from being kidnapped by the armed goons.

Industries and trade
Sunam has a Grain Market, wholesale cloth market,wholesale utensils market and a Sarafa Bazar(Gold Jeweller's Market) in Town Side area of Sunam. Naya bazar and peeran wala Gate is the main bazaar of Sunam.

Education
Sunam has two colleges, the Guru Nanak Dev Dental College Sunam, and Shaheed Udham Singh Govt College Sunam.

Hindu Sabha High School
This is one of three oldest public high schools of Sunam. Hindu Sabha High School Sunam was started on 19 February 1948. Sh. Karta Ram Jindal was the headmaster from 1965 till 1992 for almost 30 years, During his tenure school grew from 100 students to 2000 students. The school celebrated its silver jubilee in 1973 and Education minister Umrao Singh inaugurated school's biggest assembly hall. This school is a non-profit and semi-government school. Later the school was upgraded to Senior Secondary school. Also Hindu Sabha College for Women was started for Arts and other subjects.

Notable People
 Shaheed Udham Singh: Sunam is the birthplace of Shaheed Udham Singh, who shot former British Indian governor Michael O'Dwyer in revenge for his support of the notorious Jallianwala Bagh massacre on 13 March 1940.

References

Cities and towns in Sangrur district